The mixed doubles competition of the 2019 World Table Tennis Championships was held from 22 to 26 April 2019. Maharu Yoshimura and Kasumi Ishikawa were the defending champions. Ishikawa initially teamed up with Tomokazu Harimoto, but Harimoto was replaced by Yoshimura due to an injury.

Xu Xin and Liu Shiwen won the title after defeating Maharu Yoshimura and Kasumi Ishikawa 11–5, 11–8, 9–11, 11–9, 11–4.

Seeds

  Wong Chun Ting /  Doo Hoi Kem (second round)
  Maharu Yoshimura /  Kasumi Ishikawa (final)
  Xu Xin /  Liu Shiwen (champions)
  Masataka Morizono /  Mima Ito (quarterfinals)
  Lee Sang-su /  Jeon Ji-hee (quarterfinals)
  Lin Yun-ju /  Cheng I-ching (third round)
  Ľubomír Pištej /  Barbora Balážová (quarterfinals)
  Ho Kwan Kit /  Lee Ho Ching (quarterfinals)
  Álvaro Robles /  Galia Dvorak (second round)
  Jang Woo-jin /  Choi Hyo-joo (third round)
  Stefan Fegerl /  Sofia Polcanova (third round)
  Patrick Franziska /  Petrissa Solja (semifinals)
  Ádám Szudi /  Szandra Pergel (third round)
  Mattias Falck /  Matilda Ekholm (second round)
  Ovidiu Ionescu /  Bernadette Szőcs (third round)
  Tristan Flore /  Laura Gasnier (third round)
  Kanak Jha /  Yue Wu (second round)
  Ham Yu-song /  Cha Hyo-sim (second round)
  Brian Afanador /  Adriana Díaz (second round)
  Cédric Nuytinck /  Lisa Lung (first round)
  Segun Toriola /  Olufunke Oshonaike (first round)
  Laurens Tromer /  Britt Eerland (first round)
  Hu Heming /  Melissa Tapper (first round)
  Omar Assar /  Dina Meshref (first round)
  Aleksandar Karakašević /  Izabela Lupulesku (first round)
  Alexander Shibaev /  Polina Mikhaylova (third round)
  Sharath Kamal /  Manika Batra (first round)
  Kane Townsend /  Michelle Bromley (first round)
  Padasak Tanviriyavechakul /  Suthasini Sawettabut (second round)
  Nándor Ecseki /  Dóra Madarász (first round)
  Gaston Alto /  Ana Codina (first round)
  Khalid Assar /  Yousra Helmy (first round)

Draw

Finals

Top half

Section 1

Section 2

Bottom half

Section 3

Section 4

References

External links
Draw

Mixed doubles